Stanislav Velický (born 16 April 1981) is a Slovak football midfielder who currently plays for the Slovak 2. liga club FK DAC 1904 Dunajská Streda. He previously played for FC Vysočina Jihlava and MFK Dolný Kubín.

References

External links

at eurofotbal.cz

1981 births
Living people
Slovak footballers
Slovakia under-21 international footballers
Association football midfielders
FK Senica players
MFK Vranov nad Topľou players
AS Trenčín players
FK Dukla Banská Bystrica players
FC Petržalka players
SV Mattersburg players
Odra Wodzisław Śląski players
AEP Paphos FC players
MFK Dolný Kubín players
FC Vysočina Jihlava players
FC DAC 1904 Dunajská Streda players
Mezőkövesdi SE footballers
Slovak Super Liga players
Nemzeti Bajnokság I players
Cypriot First Division players
Slovak expatriate footballers
Expatriate footballers in Austria
Expatriate footballers in Poland
Expatriate footballers in Cyprus
Expatriate footballers in the Czech Republic
Expatriate footballers in Hungary
Slovak expatriate sportspeople in Austria
Slovak expatriate sportspeople in Poland
Slovak expatriate sportspeople in Cyprus
Slovak expatriate sportspeople in the Czech Republic
Slovak expatriate sportspeople in Hungary
People from Senica District
Sportspeople from the Trnava Region